Johann Gottfried Haid (1710 – 1776) was a German engraver known for his mezzotint copies of old masters. His son Johann Elias Haid also became an engraver and took over his publishing house called "J.J. Haid & Sohn".

References 

 Johann Gottfried Haid in RKDimages

1710 births
1776 deaths
People from Augsburg
German engravers